Roberto Floriano (born 14 August 1986) is an Italian professional footballer who plays as a forward for Serie C Group A club Sangiuliano City.

Career

Youth career
Born in Albstadt, Baden-Württemberg, Floriano moved back to Italy at young age. He played for Lombardy side Legnano and in July 2003 returned to Internazionale. In 2003–04 season he was promoted to Berretti under-20 team (B team of under-20). He also played once for Azzurri in a training match, which he borrowed to Italy national team against Inter Berretti, partnered with Bernardo Corradi. In 2004–05 season he remained at Berretti and scored 5 goals in regular season and twice more in playoffs. The team losing to Juventus 3–4 aggregate in the finals. That season he also played a few matches for the U-20 A team: Primavera, scored his only goal in Inter Primavera 5–0 Verona Primavera. He was released at the end of season.

Serie D
From 2005–06 to 2009–10 he played in Serie D (Italian fifth level until 2014). Despite called non-professional level, the players could receive some compensation and the amount was regulated by FIGC. He played for Seregno and then moved to Colognese. He scored 10 league goals in 2009–10 season (in Serie D Group B).

Serie C
In July 2010 he was signed by 2010 Serie D Group B champion Tritium. He played 23 times in 2010–11 Lega Pro Seconda Divisione (Group A), scored 5 goals. The team won the champion and promoted to Italian third level, in which he played 14 times, scoring also one goal.
On 26 January 2012 he moved to Alessandria, in Lega Pro Seconda Divisione. After playing 3 matches with Bulgarian Botev Vratsa which he had joined in the summer of 2012, in January 2013 he moved to Pistoiese, in Serie D.

In July 2013 he was signed by Lega Pro Seconda Divisione club Mantova F.C. On 10 January 2014 he signed a new contract which last until 30 June 2017. He scored 19 goals as the joint-second topscorer of the whole division. The club also qualified as the 8th of Group A for the next season, a unified Serie C since it was split into two divisions in 1978.

In July 2014 he was signed by Lega Pro Prima Divisione club Barletta.

On 2 January 2015 he has been presented as a new player of A.C. Pisa 1909. The player signed a contract that will keep him under the leaning tower of Pisa until 30 June 2018.

On 27 June 2015 he was signed by Foggia for an undisclosed fee. But in the following year, he left for Carrarese on a temporary deal.

In June 2018 he was signed for SSC Bari in Serie D (forth division) and during the regular season he scored 12 goals, being instrumental in the club's immediate promotion to Serie C. He left Bari in January 2020 to join another phoenix club, Palermo, being part of the Rosanero winning campaign that led them to Serie C. He was subsequently confirmed also in the two following Serie C seasons for the Sicilians.

During the 2021–22 Serie C season, Floriano turned out to be instrumental during Palermo's successful promotion playoff campaign, scoring several deciding goals, including the winning one in the first leg final against Padova. On 14 July 2022, Palermo formally extended Floriano's contract for one more year, thus giving him the chance to play again in the Serie B at the age of 36.

On 6 January 2023, Floriano joined Serie C side Sangiuliano City on a permanent deal, signing a contract until June 2024.

Career statistics

Club

Honours
Lega Pro Seconda Divisione: 2010

References

External links
 LaSerieD.com Profile 
 Tritium Profile 
 Football.it Profile 

1986 births
People from Albstadt
Sportspeople from Tübingen (region)
Living people
Italian footballers
A.C. Legnano players
Inter Milan players
U.S. 1913 Seregno Calcio players
Tritium Calcio 1908 players
U.S. Alessandria Calcio 1912 players
FC Botev Vratsa players
U.S. Pistoiese 1921 players
Mantova 1911 players
A.S.D. Barletta 1922 players
Pisa S.C. players
Calcio Foggia 1920 players
Carrarese Calcio players
S.S.C. Bari players
Palermo F.C. players
F.C. Sangiuliano City players
Serie B players
Serie C players
Serie D players
First Professional Football League (Bulgaria) players
Italian expatriate footballers
Expatriate footballers in Bulgaria
Association football forwards